Mutiny on the Bounty is a 1935  Metro-Goldwyn-Mayer drama film directed by Frank Lloyd and starring Charles Laughton and Clark Gable, based on the 1932 Charles Nordhoff and James Norman Hall novel Mutiny on the Bounty.

Despite historical inaccuracies, the film was a huge box office success, becoming the highest-grossing film of 1935 and one of MGM's biggest hits of the 1930s. The film received a leading eight nominations at the 8th Academy Awards, winning only Best Picture.

Plot
One night in Portsmouth, England, in 1787, a press gang breaks into a local tavern and presses all of the men drinking there into naval service. Upon inquiring as to who the captain is, another man is told the captain is William Bligh (Charles Laughton) and attempts to escape, as Bligh is a brutal tyrant who routinely administers harsh punishment to officers and crew alike who lack discipline, cause any infraction on board the ship, or defy his authority in any manner.

The Bounty leaves England several days later on a two-year voyage over the Pacific Ocean. Fletcher Christian (Clark Gable), the ship's lieutenant, is a formidable yet compassionate man who disapproves of Bligh's treatment of the crew. Roger Byam (Franchot Tone) is an idealistic midshipman who is divided between his loyalty to Bligh, owing to his family's naval tradition, and his friendship with Christian.

During the voyage, the enmity between Christian and Bligh grows after Christian openly challenges Bligh's unjust practices aboard the ship. When the ship arrives at the island of Tahiti, where the crew acquires breadfruit plants to take to the West Indies, Bligh punishes Christian by refusing to let him leave the ship during their stay.

Byam, meanwhile, sets up residency on the island and lives with the island chief, Hitihiti (William Bambridge), and his daughter, Tehani (Movita Castaneda), and he compiles an English dictionary of the Tahitian language. Hitihiti persuades Bligh to allow Christian a day pass on the island. Bligh agrees, but quickly repeals the pass out of spite. Christian disregards the order and spends his day off the ship romancing a Tahitian girl, Maimiti (Mamo Clark). Christian promises her he will be back someday.

After leaving Tahiti, the crew begins to talk of mutiny after Bligh's harsh discipline leads to the death of the ship's beloved surgeon, Mr. Bacchus (Dudley Digges), and Bligh severely cuts water rationing to the crew in favor of providing more water for the breadfruit plants.

Christian, although initially opposing the idea, decides he can no longer tolerate Bligh's brutality when he witnesses crew members shackled in iron chains, and he approves the mutiny. The crew raids the weapons cabinet and seizes the ship. Bligh and his loyalists are cast into a boat and set adrift at sea with a map and rations to ensure their survival. Due to Bligh's steady leadership, they are able to find their way back to land.

Meanwhile, Christian orders that Bounty return to Tahiti. Byam, who was in his cabin during the mutiny, disapproves of what Christian has done and decides the two can no longer be friends.

Months later, Byam is married to Tehani, and Christian has married Maimiti and has a child with her, while the rest of the crew are enjoying their freedom on the island. After a long estrangement, Byam and Christian reconcile their friendship. However, when the British ship HMS Pandora is spotted approaching, Byam and Christian decide they must part ways. Byam and several crew members remain on the island for the ship to take them back to England, while Christian leads the remaining crew, his wife, and several Tahitian men and women back on board Bounty in search of a new island on which to seek refuge.

Byam boards Pandora and, much to his surprise, discovers that Bligh is the captain. Bligh, who suspects that Byam was complicit in the mutiny, has him imprisoned for the remainder of the journey across the sea.

Back in England, Byam is court-martialed and found guilty of mutiny. Before the court condemns him, Byam speaks of Bligh's cruel, dehumanising conduct aboard Bounty. Due to the intervention of his friend Sir Joseph Banks (Henry Stephenson) and Lord Hood (David Torrence), Byam is pardoned by King George III and allowed to resume his naval career at sea.

Meanwhile, Christian has found Pitcairn, an uninhabited yet sustainable island that he believes will provide adequate refuge from the reach of the Royal Navy. After Bounty crashes on the rocks, Christian orders her to be burned.

Cast

 Charles Laughton as Captain Bligh
 Clark Gable as Fletcher Christian
 Franchot Tone as Byam
 Herbert Mundin as Smith
 Eddie Quillan as Ellison
 Dudley Digges as Bacchus
 Donald Crisp as Burkitt
 Henry Stephenson as Sir Joseph Banks
 Francis Lister as Capt. Nelson
 Spring Byington as Mrs. Byam
 Movita Castaneda as Tehani (as Movita)
 Mamo Clark as Maimiti (as Mamo)
 Byron Russell as Quintal
 David Torrence as Lord Hood
 John Harrington as Mr. Purcell
 Douglas Walton as Stewart
 Ian Wolfe as Maggs
 DeWitt Jennings as Fryer
 Ivan F. Simpson as Morgan (as Ivan Simpson)
 Vernon Downing as Hayward
 Bill Bambridge as Hitihiti (as William Bambridge)
 Marion Clayton as Mary Ellison
 Stanley Fields as Muspratt
 Wallis Clark as Morrison
 Crauford Kent as Lt. Edwards (as Craufurd Kent)
 Pat Flaherty as Churchill
 Alec Craig as McCoy
 Hal LeSueur as Millard
 Harry Allen as Wherryman (uncredited)
 Dick Winslow as Tinkler
 Charles Irwin as Thompson

Historical accuracy

The movie contains several historical inaccuracies. Captain Bligh was never on board , nor was he present at the trial of the mutineers who stayed on Tahiti.

At the time, he was halfway around the world on a second voyage for breadfruit plants. Fletcher Christian's father had died many years before Christian's travels on board Bounty, whereas the film shows the elder Christian at the trial. The movie was always presented as an adaptation of the Nordhoff and Hall trilogy, which already differed from the actual story of the mutiny.

Bligh is initially depicted as a brutal, sadistic disciplinarian, only becoming more sympathetic during the voyage to Timor. Particular episodes include a keelhauling and flogging a dead man. Neither of these happened. Keelhauling was used rarely, if at all, and had been abandoned long before Bligh's time. Indeed, the meticulous record of Bountys log reveals that the flogging rate was lower than the average for that time.

Prior to the mutiny, Bounty had only two deaths. One seaman, James Valentine, died of an ill-defined respiratory illness; logs indicate he was "seized with a violent hollow Cough and spit much." And the ship's surgeon, Thomas Huggan, apparently died of complications due to his chronic alcoholism, not as a result of abuse by Bligh. In fact, Bligh had threatened to seize and impound Huggan's alcohol stocks on account of him regularly being intoxicated while on duty, a threat Bligh eventually carried out. Huggan's constant drunkenness left Bligh little choice but to oversee key health issues himself. Notably, the crew had been examined constantly for scurvy, and Bligh – his expertise in this matter developed under Captain James Cook – had detected no verified signs of the illness at any time.

Likewise, the film shows the mutineers taking over the ship only after killing several loyal crewmen, when in fact none died (although one crewman came very close to shooting Bligh until stopped by Christian). Lastly, Christian is shown being inspired to take over the ship after several crewmen have unjustly been put into irons by Bligh; this is fictional.

In the final scene of the film, Christian gives a rousing speech to his fellow mutineers, speaking of creating a perfect society of free men on Pitcairn, away from Bligh and the navy. The reality was very different as mutineers enslaved Tahitian men.

For historical accuracy, Clark Gable reluctantly had to shave off his moustache because the sailors in the Royal Navy in the 18th century had to be clean-shaven. Midshipman Roger Byam was based on a real person, Midshipman Peter Heywood, who is not listed in the novel or motion picture. Just as the fictional Byam is pardoned at the end of the film, the real-life Peter Heywood was pardoned for his part in the mutiny. MGM trailers in 1935 made an error calling Midshipman Byam an ensign.

Mutineer Thomas Ellison is depicted as being allowed to see his wife before his execution. There is no record to indicate that the real Ellison was married, and in any case, a consolation visit of this type never would have been permitted in real life.

Production

Filming locations

 French Polynesia
 Metro-Goldwyn-Mayer Studios – 10202 W. Washington Blvd., Culver City, California, USA (studio)
 Monterey Bay, Monterey, California, USA
 Monterey Harbor, Monterey, California, USA
 Sailing Ship Restaurant, Pier 42, The Embarcadero, San Francisco, California, USA (ship "Ellen" as "The Bounty")
 San Miguel Island, California, USA
 Santa Barbara Channel, Channel Islands, California, USA
 Santa Catalina Island, Channel Islands, California, USA
 South Beach Harbor, South Beach, San Francisco, California, USA (ship "Ellen" as "The Bounty")
 South Pacific, Pacific Ocean
 Tahiti, French Polynesia

James Cagney (then on a hiatus from Warner Bros. during a contract dispute) and future stars David Niven and Dick Haymes were uncredited extras in the movie. Cagney is clearly visible toward the beginning of the film. He was sailing his boat near where the film was shooting near Catalina Island; director Frank Lloyd was an old friend of his, and Cagney asked him if he could play a small part in the film, saying, jokingly, "I need the money". Lloyd had Cagney dressed in a crewman's clothes and put him in the background of a few scenes.

Charles Laughton, who had a severe self-image complex concerning his weight and unattractive looks, suffered horribly in comparing himself to the handsome, masculine Clark Gable. Laughton would constantly watch his own walk, gestures, and face, making sure not to let his complex be projected.

Ship
A British merchant navy officer recalled in his memoirs seeing the fore and aft-rigged schooner Commodore II being broken up in Cape Town in 1945, having suffered severe gale damage, and that this was the ship that had been re-rigged for the film.

Reception

Contemporary reviews were enthusiastic. Andre Sennwald of The New York Times wrote, "Grim, brutal, sturdily romantic, made out of horror and desperate courage, it is as savagely exciting and rousingly dramatic a photoplay as has come out of Hollywood in recent years. The Nordhoff-Hall trilogy was, of course, born to be filmed, and Metro-Goldwyn-Mayer has given it the kind of production a great story deserves." The Hollywood Reporter raved that it was "one of the greatest films of all time", with "the epic sweep of the sea itself." Variety called it "Hollywood at its very best. The story certainly could not have been presented as powerfully through any other medium." Film Daily wrote, "This is one of the most important productions since the inception of talking pictures. It is grim, gripping and pictorially perfect." John Mosher of The New Yorker declared that the filmmakers had "done a good, solid, fine job" and wrote that Laughton's performance as Captain Bligh "may not be exactly the image of the original brute, but it's a Laughton masterpiece." Mutiny on the Bounty topped the annual Film Daily poll of 523 critics as the best film of 1936 (it was released too late in the year to appear on the 1935 ballot).

Rotten Tomatoes reports a 96% approval rating based on 74 reviews, with a weighted average of 8.60/10. The site's consensus reads: "The historical inaccuracies in this high-seas adventure are more than offset by its timeless themes, larger-than-life performances from Clark Gable and Charles Laughton, and Frank Lloyd's superb direction".

Box office
According to MGM records the film earned $2,250,000 in the US and Canada and $2,210,000 elsewhere resulting in a profit of $909,000.

It was the 3rd most popular film at the British box office in 1935–36.

Awards and honors

Academy Awards 
This film is, as of 2021, the last Best Picture winner to win in no other category (following The Broadway Melody and Grand Hotel).  It is the only film to have three Best Actor nominations. As a result of this, a Best Supporting Actor category was created for the Oscars, beginning with the following year's awards ceremony.

Other honors 

American Film Institute recognition
 AFI's 100 Years... 100 Movies #86
 AFI's 100 Years... 100 Heroes and Villains:
 Captain Bligh, Villain #19

Cancelled sequels
In 1940 Frank Lloyd was reported as wanting to make a film about the life of Captain Bligh starring Spencer Tracy or Charles Laughton, at Universal. It was never made.

In 1945, it was reported that MGM would make a sequel with Gable, Christian of the Bounty. It would be based on a novel by Charles Nordhoff about Christian's romantic adventures in England and South America following the colonization of Pitcairn Island and would be produced by Carey Wilson. It was never made.

Other film versions 
A 1962 three-hour-plus widescreen Technicolor remake, starring Marlon Brando as Fletcher Christian and Trevor Howard as Capt. Bligh, was a disaster both critically and financially at the time. Nonetheless, the remake was nominated for a Best Picture Oscar.

In 1984, Mel Gibson played Christian opposite Anthony Hopkins as Bligh in a film (based not upon the Nordhoff-Hall novels but on an historical work by Richard Hough) called The Bounty. This latest version, which gives a far more sympathetic view of Bligh, is considered to be the closest to historical events.

The 1935 version was itself not the first film account of the mutiny. In 1933 an Australian film entitled In the Wake of the Bounty, with the then-unknown Errol Flynn as Fletcher Christian, was released, but was not successful and received few bookings outside Australia. Flynn noted in his autobiography that whenever he mentioned that he'd played Christian in an Australian version of Mutiny on the Bounty two years before Gable, no one ever believed him. There was also an even earlier film, the 1916 Australian–New Zealand film, The Mutiny on the Bounty directed by Raymond Longford.

Parodies
 Friz Freleng's cartoon Mutiny on the Bunny casts Yosemite Sam (called Shanghai Sam) as a foul-tempered skipper who shanghais Bugs Bunny, only to see Bugs rebel. Also, in one scene in Freleng's earlier Buccaneer Bunny, Bugs dresses up as Capt. Bligh (including a visual and vocal impression of Charles Laughton) and barks out orders to Sam (called Seagoin' Sam).
 The 1967 Lost in Space episode "Mutiny in Space" features Ronald Long imitating Charles Laughton in the role of spaceship captain "Admiral Zahrk." 
 Morecambe and Wise performed a sketch with Arthur Lowe (who played Captain Mainwaring in Dad's Army) as Captain Bligh. At the end of the sketch it is announced Bligh has some loyal crewmen who turn out to be other cast members of Dad's Army. 
 "Holidays at Home", a 1978 episode of It Ain't Half Hot Mum, includes a dream sequence where the sitcom's cast enact scenes from the film.
 The Simpsons episode "The Wettest Stories Ever Told" features the family telling stories set on ships. The second segment is a parody on Mutiny on the Bounty and casts Principal Skinner as Capt. Bligh, brutalizing the crew members (played by Bart, Milhouse, Martin, Nelson, Jimbo, Dolph and Kearney).

References

External links 

 
 
 
 
 
 Southseascinema.org
 Mutiny on the Bounty at Virtual History

1935 films
Films set in 1787
American historical films
Best Picture Academy Award winners
Films based on American novels
1930s adventure drama films
1930s historical films
American adventure drama films
American epic films
Military courtroom films
Metro-Goldwyn-Mayer films
1930s English-language films
Films about HMS Bounty
Films about capital punishment
Films directed by Frank Lloyd
Films produced by Irving Thalberg
Films shot in French Polynesia
Films shot in California
Films with screenplays by Jules Furthman
Films scored by Herbert Stothart
Seafaring films based on actual events
Seafaring films
Films set on ships
Films about the Royal Navy
1930s American films